Erumaipatti block is a revenue block in the Namakkal district of Tamil Nadu, in India. The headquarter of the block is in Erumaipatti. The block has a total of 24 panchayat villages. 

Name of the Panchayats:

ALANGANATHAM
BODINAICKENPATTI
BOMMASAMUDRAM
DEVARAYAPURAM
KAVAKARANPATTI
KODIKKALPUDUR
KONANGIPATTI
METTUPATTI
MUTHUGAPATTTI
MUTTANCHETTI
PALAYAPALAYAM
PAVITHRAM
PAVITHRAM PUDUR
PERUMAPATTI
POTTIREDDIPATTI
PUDUKOTTAI
REDDIPATTI
SEVINTHIPATTI
SIVANAICKENPATTI
THIPRAMADEVI
VADAVATHUR
VALAVANTHI
VARADHARAJAPURAM
VARAGUR

References 
 
 

Revenue blocks of Namakkal district